Borač is a village in the municipality of Knić, Serbia. According to the 2011 census, the village has a population of 590 inhabitants.

Population

References

Populated places in Šumadija District